Austin & Ally: Take It from the Top is the third and final soundtrack to the Disney Channel Original Series, Austin & Ally, following the soundtrack debut with the same name (2012) and  Austin & Ally: Turn It Up  (2013). The soundtrack features 5 songs performed by the show's stars, Ross Lynch and Laura Marano. The soundtrack was released on March 31, 2015.

Track listing

Charts

References

External links

Walt Disney Records soundtracks
2015 soundtrack albums